Kankelau is a municipality in the district of Lauenburg, in Schleswig-Holstein, Germany. The village was first mentioned in 1230 AD as "Cankelowe" (meaning: settlement in the corn cockles), the spelling later changed to Kankelowe (1278), Kankelow (1434), and Kankelauw (1450).

References

HansWilhelm Haefs (2004): Ortsnamen und Ortsgeschichten aus Schleswig-Holstein, page 141 (in German)
Unser Dorf Kankelau, retrieved Oct 2008 (in German)

Herzogtum Lauenburg